Kelly Paul Oubre Jr. (born December 9, 1995) is an American professional basketball player for the Charlotte Hornets of the National Basketball Association (NBA). Oubre played one season of college basketball for the University of Kansas before being selected by the Atlanta Hawks with the 15th overall pick in the 2015 NBA draft, who then traded him to the Washington Wizards. Oubre has also played for the Phoenix Suns and Golden State Warriors.

Early life

Oubre was the second child born in New Orleans, Louisiana to Kelly Oubre Sr. and Tonya Coleman (formerly Oubre). Oubre and his family lived in the Magnolia public housing project from his birth until the early part of his childhood, later settling in the Eastover section of New Orleans. Oubre attended Edward Hynes Elementary School (now known as Hynes Charter School) and played for three Milne Boys Home (now known as New Orleans Recreation Development Commission) basketball teams during that time. Oubre's family moved to Richmond, Texas after Hurricane Katrina in 2005. Oubre attended George Bush High School in Fort Bend, Texas before transferring to Findlay Prep in Henderson, Nevada for his senior season. In October 2013, Oubre committed to playing for the Kansas Jayhawks in 2014–15.

College career
As a freshman at Kansas in 2014–15, Oubre was twice named Big 12 Newcomer of the Week and subsequently earned All-Newcomer Team honors. He also earned All-Big 12 Honorable Mention honors. In 36 games (27 starts) for the Jayhawks in 2014–15, Oubre averaged 9.3 points, 5.0 rebounds and 1.1 steals in 21.0 minutes per game.

On April 1, 2015, Oubre declared for the NBA draft, forgoing his final three years of college eligibility.

Professional career

Washington Wizards (2015–2018)

Oubre was selected by the Atlanta Hawks with the 15th overall pick in the 2015 NBA draft. His draft rights were then traded to the Washington Wizards. On December 16, 2015, he scored a career-high 18 points on 6-of-15 shooting in a 114–95 loss to the San Antonio Spurs. Throughout his limited playing time during his rookie season, Oubre showed signs of becoming an effective "3 and D" player.

On November 28, 2016, Oubre recorded his first career double-double with 10 points and 10 rebounds in a 101–95 overtime win over the Sacramento Kings. On December 10, he scored a career-high 19 points to go with nine rebounds and three steals in Washington's 110–105 win over the Milwaukee Bucks. Oubre was suspended for game four of the Wizards' second-round playoff series against the Boston Celtics after he was ejected in game three for shoving Boston's Kelly Olynyk.

In 2017–18, Oubre scored over 20 points five times, including setting a career high with 26 points on January 19 in a 122–112 win over the Detroit Pistons. However, beginning the year shooting 44.9 percent from the field and 40.5 percent from the perimeter through 46 games, Oubre shot just 34.9 percent from the field and 27.4 percent from three in his last 35 games to close the regular season.

On December 10, 2018, Oubre scored a then season-high 23 points in a 109–101 loss to the Indiana Pacers.

Phoenix Suns (2018–2020)
On December 17, 2018, Oubre was traded with Austin Rivers to the Phoenix Suns for Trevor Ariza. He made his debut for the Suns two days later, scoring 13 points in a 111–103 win over the Boston Celtics. On January 8, 2019, Oubre matched his career high with 26 points in a 115–111 win over the Sacramento Kings. Four days later, he matched his career high with 26 points and tied his career best with 11 rebounds in a 102–93 win over the Denver Nuggets. On February 8, he recorded 25 points and a then career-high 12 rebounds in a 117–107 loss to the Golden State Warriors. On February 13, he scored a then career-high 28 points in a 134–107 loss to the Los Angeles Clippers. On March 16, he scored a career-high 32 points in a 138–136 overtime win over the New Orleans Pelicans. On March 21, he was ruled out for the rest of the season with a left thumb injury.

On July 16, 2019, Oubre signed a two-year, $30 million contract extension with the Phoenix Suns. On December 5, Oubre grabbed a career-high 15 rebounds alongside 14 points and four blocks in a 139–132 overtime win over the New Orleans Pelicans. Oubre matched his career-high for rebounds on December 28, scoring 20 points as well, in a 112–110 win over the Sacramento Kings. On January 12, 2020, Oubre matched his career-high of 15 rebounds for the third time in the 2019–20 season, scoring 25 points this time in a 100–92 win over the Charlotte Hornets. On February 7, Oubre scored a career-high 39 points in a 127–91 win over the Houston Rockets. Despite playing a full 38 minutes in a 131–111 win over the Utah Jazz on February 24, 2020, Oubre was ruled out the next day due to a right knee injury. The injury was later reported as a right meniscus tear. On March 3, 2020, Oubre underwent a successful arthroscopic surgery regarding the torn meniscus in his right knee and would be re-evaluated in four weeks.

Golden State Warriors (2020–2021)
On November 16, 2020, Oubre, along with Jalen Lecque, Ricky Rubio, Ty Jerome, and a 2022 first-round draft pick, was traded to the Oklahoma City Thunder for Abdel Nader and Chris Paul. On November 22, Oubre was traded to the Golden State Warriors in exchange for a conditional 2021 first-round pick and 2021 second-round pick. On December 22, 2020, Oubre made his Warriors debut, putting up six points and seven rebounds in a 125–99 loss to the Brooklyn Nets. On February 4, 2021, Oubre scored a career-high 40 points in a 147–116 win over the Dallas Mavericks.

Charlotte Hornets (2021–present)
Oubre signed a 2-year, $25 million contract with the Charlotte Hornets on August 7, 2021. On October 20, he made his Hornets debut, scoring 14 points in a 123–122 win over the Indiana Pacers.
On January 26, 2022, Oubre scored a season-high 39 points and a career-high 10 three-pointers in a 158–126 win over the Indiana Pacers.

Career statistics

NBA

Regular season

|-
| style="text-align:left;"| 
| style="text-align:left;"| Washington
| 63 || 9 || 10.7 || .427 || .336 || .633 || 2.1 || .2 || .3 || .1 || 3.7
|-
| style="text-align:left;"| 
| style="text-align:left;"| Washington
| 79 || 5 || 20.3 || .421 || .287 || .758 || 3.3 || .6 || .7 || .2 || 6.3
|-
| style="text-align:left;"| 
| style="text-align:left;"| Washington
| 81 || 11 || 27.5 || .403 || .341 || .820 || 4.5 || 1.2 || 1.0 || .4 || 11.8
|-
| style="text-align:left;"| 
| style="text-align:left;"| Washington
| 29 || 7 || 26.0 || .433 || .311 || .800 || 4.4 || .7 || .9 || .7 || 12.9
|-
| style="text-align:left;"| 
| style="text-align:left;"| Phoenix
| 40 || 12 || 29.5 || .453 || .325 || .761 || 4.9 || 1.6 || 1.4 || 1.0 || 16.9
|-
| style="text-align:left;"| 
| style="text-align:left;"| Phoenix
| 56 || 55 || 34.5 || .452 || .352 || .780 || 6.4 || 1.5 || 1.3 || .7 || 18.7
|-
| style="text-align:left;"|
| style="text-align:left;"|Golden State
| 55 || 50 || 30.7 || .439 || .316 || .695 || 6.0 || 1.3 || 1.0 || .8 || 15.4
|-
| style="text-align:left;"|
| style="text-align:left;"|Charlotte
| 76 || 13 || 26.3 || .440 || .345 || .667 || 4.0 || 1.1 || 1.0 || .4 || 15.0
|- class="sortbottom"
| style="text-align:center;" colspan="2"| Career
| 479 || 162 || 25.2 || .434 || .331 || .749 || 4.3 || 1.0 || .9 || .5 || 12.0

Playoffs

|-
| style="text-align:left;"| 2017
| style="text-align:left;"| Washington
| 12 || 0 || 15.3 || .426 || .367 || .700 || 2.3 || .3 || .8 || .4 || 5.8
|-
| style="text-align:left;"| 2018
| style="text-align:left;"| Washington
| 6 || 1 || 24.7 || .375 || .211 || .889 || 3.8 || .7 || 1.0 || .5 || 9.3
|- class="sortbottom"
| style="text-align:center;" colspan="2"| Career
| 18 || 1 || 18.4 || .404 || .306 || .821 || 2.8 || .4 || .9 || .4 || 7.0

College

|-
| style="text-align:left;"| 2014–15
| style="text-align:left;"| Kansas
| 36 || 27 || 21.0 || .444 || .358 || .718 || 5.0 || .8 || 1.1 || .4 || 9.3

Personal life
During his tenure with the Phoenix Suns, Oubre created a brand name of merchandise to help celebrate the community in Arizona and the team that he became a part of for the growth of their future. The "Valley Boyz" name that he came up with for this brand first originated as a hashtag by Oubre on January 9, 2019 as a location tag for the team on Instagram. Initial proceeds from the local sales in Phoenix's Uptown Plaza were given to his teammate Deandre Ayton as proceeds for hurricane relief efforts against Hurricane Dorian in the Bahamas through UNICEF. In addition to the Valley Boyz brand, Oubre also helped design and promote the team's "City Edition" jerseys for the 2020–21 season.

References

External links

Kansas Jayhawks bio

1995 births
Living people
21st-century African-American sportspeople
African-American basketball players
American men's basketball players
Atlanta Hawks draft picks
Basketball players from New Orleans
Basketball players from Texas
Charlotte Hornets players
Findlay Prep alumni
Golden State Warriors players
Kansas Jayhawks men's basketball players
Louisiana Creole people
McDonald's High School All-Americans
Parade High School All-Americans (boys' basketball)
People from Richmond, Texas
Phoenix Suns players
Small forwards
Sportspeople from the Houston metropolitan area
Washington Wizards players